Mount Pleasant is a rural locality in the Moreton Bay Region, Queensland, Australia.

Mount Pleasant is also a mountain in the north-east of the locality (height ) which is part of the D'Aguilar Range.

Geography
Other mountains in the D'Aguilar Range include Mount Nebo, Mount Glorious and Mount Mee.

History
Upper North Pine Provisional School opened in late 1880. It closed following the dismissal of teacher Mr Storey, re-opening circa July 1887 with a new teacher, Mr E. Sinclair. On 1 January 1909, it became Upper North Pine State School. It closed in February 1942. It was on Mount Pleasant Road.

Mount Pleasant Provisional School opened on 28 August 1905. On 1 January 1909, it became Mount Pleasant State School. It closed in 1965. and closed on 1965. It was at approx 259 Mount Brisbane Road.

In April 1920, the Upper North Pine Honour Roll was unveiled in the Mount Pleasant School of Arts by Richard Warren, the Member of the Queensland Legislative Assembly for Murrumba. The roll has the names of the 26 World War I servicemen from the Mount Pleasant and Lacey Creek districts; nine of them died in the war.

The median age of the Mount Pleasant population was 37 years, the same as the national median.  86.5% of people living in Mount Pleasant were born in Australia. The other top responses for country of birth were England 6.6%, New Zealand 3%, Canada 1.7%, Belgium 1%.  97.7% of people spoke only English at home.

Amenities

Mount Pleasant Community Hall (formerly Mount Pleasant Public Hall & School of Arts) is at 352 Mount Pleasant Road.

References

External links

Localities in Queensland
Suburbs of Moreton Bay Region
Pleasant